The 1983 World Wrestling Championships were held in Kyiv, Soviet Union, in three amateur wrestling styles, recognized by FILA. Greco-Roman style wrestling competition was contested 22–25 September, freestyle wrestlers competed 26–29 September, Sambo wrestlers competed 30 September — 1 October.

Medal table

Team ranking

Medal summary

Men's freestyle

Men's Greco-Roman

References

External links
UWW Database

World Wrestling Championships
Wrestling
W
World Wrestling Championships